The Golden Spider is a 1943 German thriller film directed by Erich Engels and starring Kirsten Heiberg, Jutta Freybe, and Harald Paulsen.

It was partly shot in Amsterdam. The film's sets were designed by the art directors Franz Bi and Bruno Lutz.

Cast
In alphabetical order

References

External links

Films of Nazi Germany
German spy thriller films
1940s spy thriller films
Films directed by Erich Engels
World War II spy films
Terra Film films
German black-and-white films
1940s German-language films
1940s German films